Bedřich Koutný (born 6 March 1931) is a Czechoslovak boxer. He competed in the men's middleweight event at the 1952 Summer Olympics.

References

External links
 

1931 births
Possibly living people
Czechoslovak male boxers
Olympic boxers of Czechoslovakia
Boxers at the 1952 Summer Olympics
Place of birth missing (living people)
Middleweight boxers